Earth vs. Shockabilly is the debut studio album of Shockabilly, released in 1983 by Rough Trade Records. It was re-issued in 1988 on Shimmy Disc with four additional tracks and again in 1989 on CD as The Ghost of Shockabilly.

Track listing

Personnel
Adapted from the Earth vs. Shockabilly liner notes.

Shockabilly
 Eugene Chadbourne – vocals, electric guitar
 Kramer – vocals, organ, tape, production, engineering
 David Licht – percussion

Production and additional personnel
 Sheena Dupuis – design
 Michael Macioce – cover art
 George Peckham – mastering
 Geoff Travis – executive producer

Charts

Release history

References

External links 
 

1983 debut albums
Shockabilly albums
Albums produced by Kramer (musician)
Celluloid Records albums
Rough Trade Records albums
Shimmy Disc albums